Iraia Iparragirre Argandoña (born 9 July 1995), also spelled as Iraia Iparraguirre Argandoña, is a Spanish footballer who plays as a defender for Real Sociedad.

Club career
Iparragirre started her career in the youth academy of Ostadar.

References

External links
Profile at Real Sociedad

1995 births
Living people
Women's association football defenders
Spanish women's footballers
People from Lasarte-Oria
Sportspeople from Gipuzkoa
Footballers from the Basque Country (autonomous community)
Añorga KKE players
Real Sociedad (women) players
Primera División (women) players